23 Standards (Quartet) 2003 is a live album 4CD box set by American composer and saxophonist Anthony Braxton recorded in Europe in 2003 and released on the Leo label in 2004

Reception

The Guardian's review by John Fordham states:

All About Jazz reviewer Rex Butters felt:

Track listing
Disc One:
 "Crazy Rhythm" (Irving Caesar, Joseph Meyer, Roger Wolfe Kahn) - 16:50
 "Off Minor" (Thelonious Monk) - 11:36
 "Desafinado" (Antônio Carlos Jobim, Newton Mendonça) - 4:35
 "26-1" (John Coltrane) - 11:15
 "Why Shouldn't I" (Cole Porter) - 10:42
 "Giant Steps" (Coltrane) - 12:32 
Disc Two: 
 "Tangerine" (Victor Schertzinger, Johnny Mercer) - 14:35
 "Black Orpheus" (Luiz Bonfá, Antônio Maria) - 13:53
 "Round Midnight" (Monk) - 13:03
 "Ju—Ju" (Wayne Shorter) - 10:26
 "After You've Gone" (Turner Layton, Henry Creamer) - 17:16	 
Disc Three: 
 "Everything I Love" (Porter) - 12:24
 "I Can't Get Started" (Vernon Duke, Ira Gershwin) - 11:09
 "It's a Raggy Waltz" (Dave Brubeck) - 10:12
 "Countdown" (Coltrane) - 12:08
 "Blue in Green" (Bill Evans) - 5:11
 "Beatrice" (Sam Rivers) - 9:27
Disc Four: 
 "Only The Lonely" (Sammy Cahn, Jimmy Van Heusen) - 6:37
 "Recorda Me" (Joe Henderson) - 15:52
 "Ill Wind" (Harold Arlen, Ted Koehler) - 17:00
 "I'll Be Easy to Find" (Bart Howard) - 11:29
 "Three to Get Ready" (Brubeck) - 10:29
 "Dolphin Dance" (Herbie Hancock) - 10:47

Recorded on February 19 at De Singel in Antwerp, Belgium (Disc Three: track 5 and Disc Four: track 2), on February 22 at Flagey in Brussels, Belgium (Disc One: tracks 5 & 6), on November 15 at the Bimhuis in Amsterdam, The Netherlands (Disc Two: tracks 1-4 & Disc Three: tracks 1-4), on November 17 at Teatro Filarmonico in Verona, Italy (Disc Three: track 6), on November 18 at the Roma Jazz Festival in, Rome, Italy (Disc One: tracks 1-4), on November 19 at Culturgest in Lisbon, Portugal (Disc Four: tracks 3-5), and on November 20 at Auditorio da Universidade de Minho in Guimaraes, Portugal (Disc Two: track 5 and Disc Four: tracks 1 & 6)

Personnel
Anthony Braxton - reeds 
Kevin O'Neil - guitar
Andy Eulau - bass
Kevin Norton - percussion

References

Sources

Leo Records live albums
Anthony Braxton live albums
2004 live albums